Norwegian fortresses or fortifications have been constructed from some of the earliest recorded periods, down through the 20th century. The geography and topography of glacially carved, mountainous Norway constrain both the sea and the land routes which an aggressor must follow. Natural strong-points, such as rock outcroppings at Halden, Tønsberg and Trondheim make excellent bases for fortification (i.e., natural fortresses).

Fortifications evolved to accommodate the offensive threat which they guard against. Early castles provided a strong defense against the attack of the day, and were normally taken by duplicity or siege. In the age of black powder, cannon allowed breaching of the fortress walls and subsequent taking by storm. As a result, fortresses changed form, now incorporating design features like the bastion, ravelin, and glacis to allow cannon within the fortress to be effective while protecting the walls and defenders from external attack. This evolution of technology continued into the 20th century as weaponry continued to evolve.

Historical context for Norwegian fortresses

Civil Wars

Baltic Power Wars
Most Norwegian fortresses were constructed in the period of intense competition among the Baltic powers (Denmark-Norway, Sweden, Russia, Poland and the German states) for northern supremacy. The 16th, 17th and beginning of the 18th Century was a period of virtually continuous war or preparation for war: 
1563 to 1570 - Nordic Seven Years' War
1611 to 1613 - Kalmar War
1618 to 1648 - Thirty Years' War (See also Hannibal War)
1655 to 1658 – Northern War
1673 to 1675 – Fortification Upgrades
1675 to 1679 – Gyldenløve War
1700 to 1721 – Great Northern War

In 1600 Denmark controlled virtually all land bordering on the Skagerrak, Kattegat, Store Bælt and the restricted Sound (Øresund). The current Swedish provinces of Skåne and Halland were Danish and the province of Båhuslen was then Norwegian (as they had been for all recorded history). All powers interested in Baltic trade, or otherwise forced to pass through waters controlled by Denmark, had a strong interest in breaking Denmark’s control and lifting the Sound Dues that Denmark levied for passage through the Øresund. Hence the naval trading powers, particularly Holland and England, contributed to the Northern unrest of the period.

And the larger political balance in Europe can not be forgotten. As one example, the danger of French domination under Louis XIV resulted in a 1668 triple alliance of England, Holland and Sweden. This alliance worked to Sweden’s favor when treaties were negotiated.

Union with Sweden

Twentieth century

Norwegian fortresses

The Castle Period (1600 and earlier)
Akershus Fortress in Oslo
Audunborg in Jølster
Bergenhus Fortress in Bergen
Broberg in Bohuslen.
Båhus Fortress
Dyngehus in Bohuslen.
Hamarhus Castle in Hamar
Isegran in Fredrikstad
Kirkwall Bishop's Palace
Mjøskastellet on Steinsholmen.
Olsborg Castle in  Bohuslen.
Oslo Kongsgård estate 
Oslo Bishop's Palace
Steinvikholm Castle in Stjørdal
Sverresborg Castle in Trondheim
Sverresborg Castle in Bergen
Tønsberg Fortress
Vardøhus Fortress
Valdisholmborg
Valkaberg castle in Oslo.

The Age of Black Powder (1600 - 1900)
Fredriksberg fortress
Fredriksholm Fortress (Kristiansand)
Fredrikstad Fortress
 Fredriksten Fortress
Fredriksværn
Kongsvinger Fortress
Basmo Fortress
Blaker Fortress
Christiansfjeld Fortress (Elverum)
Munkholmen Fortress (Trondheim)
Staverns Fortress
Christiansholm Fortress (Kristiansand)
Christiansø Fortress
Kristiansten Fortress (Trondheim)
Altenhus Fortress (Alta)

Modern fortresses
Hegra Fortress
Helgøya Fortress
Kvarven Fort
Odderøya Fortress
Oscarsborg Fortress
Trondenes Fort
Meløyvær Fortress
Møvik Fortress

References

Bibliography
Norges festninger by Guthorm Kavli; Universitetsforlaget; 1987; 
The Struggle for Supremacy in the Baltic: 1600-1725 by Jill Lisk; Funk & Wagnalls, New York, 1967
The Northern Wars, 1558-1721 by Robert I. Frost; Longman, Harlow, England; 2000

External links
Akershus Fortress
Fredrikstad Fortress
Trondheim Fortress
Blaker Fortress
Christiansfjeld Fortress on digital archives
Oscarsborg Fortress
Hegra Fortress
Meløyvær Fortress
Møvik Fort

 
Fortresses in Norway
Fortresses
Norway
Forts